is a city located in Yamanashi Prefecture, Japan. ,  the city had an estimated population of 23,976 in 10404 households, and a population density of 86 persons per km2.

Geography
Ōtsuki is located in eastern Yamanashi Prefecture, approximately 80 kilometers from Tokyo. the city is located in the Chichibu and the Tanzawa Mountains and the Sagami River (known locally as the Katsura River) flows through the city.

Surrounding municipalities
Yamanashi Prefecture
Uenohara
Tsuru
Kōshū
Fuefuki
Fujikawaguchiko
Kosuge

Climate
The city has a climate characterized by hot and humid summers, and relatively mild winters (Köppen climate classification Cfa).  The average annual temperature in Ōtsuki is 11.2 °C. The average annual rainfall is 1523 mm with September as the wettest month. The temperatures are highest on average in August, at around 23.5 °C, and lowest in January, at around -0.5 °C.

Demographics
Per Japanese census data, the population of Ōtsuki has declined at an accelerating rate in recent decades.

History
Located in the headwaters of the Sagami River, the area around present-day Ōtsuki was heavily settled in the Jōmon period, and over 80 Jōmon sites have been found within city limits. However, there are fewer Yayoi period sites. During the Nara period ritsuryo organization of Kai Province, the area came under Tsuru County. From the middle of the Kamakura period, much of the province came under the control of the Takeda clan.

During the Edo period, all of Kai Province was tenryō territory under direct control of the Tokugawa shogunate, although the portion around modern day Ōtsuki was part of the short-lived Tamimura Domain, which was suppressed in 1704. Also during the Edo period, the Kōshū Kaidō, one of the Edo Five Routes, passed through Ōtsuki, which with 12 of the 45 post stations has more post stations than any other municipality in Japan. The eleven post stations spread from Shimotorisawa-shuku to Kuronoda-shuku.

During the cadastral reform of the early Meiji period on July 1, 1889, the village of Hirosato was created within Kitatsuru District, Yamanashi Prefecture. On April 1, 1933 the village was raised to town status, and renamed Ōtsuki. The town was bombed by the United States on August 13, 1945, only two days before the end of World War II.  The town was elevated to city status on August 8, 1954 by merging with the neighboring towns of Saruhashi and Nanaho and the villages of  Sasago, Nigioka, Hatsukari and Yanagawa.

Government
Ōtsuki has a mayor-council form of government with a directly elected mayor and a unicameral city legislature of 12 members.

Economy
Ōtsuki was noted traditionally for its production of fine silk. In the modern period, it became the location of numerous factories producing synthetic fibers.

Education
Ohtsuki City College
Ōtsuki has five public elementary schools and two public middle schools operated by the city government and two public high schools operated by the Yamanashi Prefectural Board of Education.

Transportation

Railway
 Central Japan Railway Company - Chūō Main Line 
 –  –  –  –  – 
 Fuji Kyuko - Fujikyuko Line
 -

Highway
  Chūō Expressway

Sister city relations
 Fraser Coast, Queensland, Australia

Local attractions
 Saruhashi - A famous historical bridge and designated National Place of Scenic Beauty
Yatsuzawa Power Station

Notable people
Masanori Murakami – former professional baseball player
Masahide Kobayashi – former professional baseball player

References

External links

Official Website 

 
Cities in Yamanashi Prefecture